Alexei Ivanovich Korzukhin (Russian: Алексей Иванович Корзухин; 1835—1894) was a Russian genre painter.

Biography
He was born into a family of gold prospectors near Yekaterinburg. As a young man, he worked in a local railway factory and the mint. He had started painting when he was still a child so, in 1858, he entered the Imperial Academy of Fine Arts where he studied under Pyotr Basin and Fyodor Bruni. In 1861, he was awarded a gold medal and a stipend for travelling expenses.

However, in 1863, he became a member of the "Revolt of the Fourteen", a group of students who favored Realism and were protesting the Academy's insistence on painting in the Classical style. He and the others withdrew from the Academy, accepting the designation of "Artist Second-Class". Shortly thereafter, he joined the Artel of Artists, an artistic commune, and remained with them until they disbanded in 1871. He also became a member of the "Association of Travelling Art Exhibitions" (Peredvizhniki) and taught drawing at the "Imperial Society for the Encouragement of the Arts".

In 1865, his painting "Wake in the Village Cemetery" earned him the rank of "Artist First-Class" and, three years later, he was named an Academician. In addition to his paintings of daily life, he did portraits and religious works. He also exhibited widely, including the Second Annual International Exhibition in London (1872), the Weltausstellung in Vienna (1873) and the Centennial Exposition in Philadelphia (1876).

He was a witness to the extremely bloody assassination of Tsar Alexander II in 1881. This resulted in severe nervous shock and he never fully recovered his health.

Selected paintings

References

Further reading 
 "Корзухин Алексей Иванович" in the Great Soviet Encyclopedia, General editor: Alexander Prokhorov, Moscow, 1973, Vol.13 "Конда — Кун" 
 Vladimir Tolstoy, "А. Корзухин" (Masters of Russian Painting Series), State Publishing House of Fine Arts, 1960. 
 I. Zhukov, Сказка о художнике и гноме Антошке (The Tale of the Artist and Antoshka, the Gnome. Alexey Korzukhin), Белый город, Moscow (2001) Children's Encyclopedia: Tales of the Artists.  
 N. O. Mayorova, "Алексей Корзухин", (Masters of Painting Series) Moscow, Белый город (2007)

External links 

19th-century painters from the Russian Empire
Russian male painters
Russian genre painters
Russian realist painters
1835 births
1894 deaths
19th-century male artists from the Russian Empire
Burials at Tikhvin Cemetery